Can't Hold Back is Eddie Money's sixth album, released in 1986. It contains one of Money's biggest hits, "Take Me Home Tonight" which helped bring both himself and Ronnie Spector back to the spotlight. The album was certified platinum by the RIAA in August 1987.

"I Wanna Go Back" is a Billy Satellite cover and first appeared on the band's eponymous 1984 debut album. The song "Stranger in a Strange Land", written by Money with Henry Small and Tom Whitlock, was covered by John Entwistle. The song was featured on Entwistle's solo album, The Rock, on which Small sang lead vocals.

Track listing

Singles
 "Take Me Home Tonight" (1986) #4 US
 "I Wanna Go Back" (1986) #14 US
 "Endless Nights" (1987) #21 US
 "We Should Be Sleeping" (1987) #90 US

Personnel
 Eddie Money – lead vocal, harmonica, keyboards, saxophone, synthesizer arrangements on "One Love"
 Richie Zito – guitars, keyboards, synthesizers, synthesizer arrangements on "One Love"
 Duncan Rowe – guitar arrangements on "One Love"
 John Nelson – guitars-all guitars on Take Me Home Tonight, Solos on Endless Nights, Calm Before the Storm and One Chance   
 Arthur Barrow – keyboards, bass
 Randy Jackson, Greg Lowry, Nathan East – bass
 Steve George – keyboards, backing vocals
 Gary Chang – synthesizers, synthesizer arrangements on "One Love" and "I Can't Hold Back"
 Eddie Ulibarri – keyboards
 Paul Hanson, Danny Hull – saxophone
 Mike Baird – drums, percussion, drum overdubs on "Stranger in a Strange Land"
 John Deleon – drums, drum programming
 "Pastiche" (Jenny Meltzer, Sandy Sukhov, Becky West), Richard Page, Joe Pizzulo, Ronnie Spector, Henry Small – additional vocals
 Marilyn Martin – backing vocal on "I Wanna Go Back"

Production
Arranged and produced by Eddie Money and Richie Zito, except "One Chance" (arranged and produced by Eddie Money, Richie Zito and David Kershenbaum)
Recording engineers – David Leonard, Michael Frondelli, Phil Kaffel
Assistant engineers – Michael Rosen, Tom Size; assistant engineers at Can-Am Studios: Jim Dineen, Stan Katayama
Mixed by Eddie Money, Richie Zito and Scott Litt
Mastered by Howie Weinberg

Certifications

Notes 

1986 albums
Eddie Money albums
Columbia Records albums
Albums produced by Richie Zito